Penzance is a town in Cornwall.

Penzance may also refer to:

Places
Penzance, Saskatchewan, Canada

Sports
Penzance A.F.C.
Penzance Sailing Club
Penzance RFC, a rugby union club

Transportation
Penzance railway station
Penzance TMD, a railway depot
Penzance Heliport
HMS Penzance (M106), Royal Navy ship
HMS Penzance (L28), Royal Navy ship

People
James Wilde, 1st Baron Penzance (1816–1899), British judge